There are 172 quota places available for qualification for badminton at the 2020 Summer Olympics . The Olympic qualification period takes place between April 29, 2019 and April 25, 2021, and the Badminton World Federation rankings list, scheduled to publish on June 15, 2021, will be used to allocate spots. Nations can enter a maximum of two players each in the men's and women's singles if both are ranked in the world's top 16; otherwise, one quota place until the roster of thirty-eight players has been completed. Similar regulations also apply to the players competing in the doubles, as the NOCs (National Olympic Committees) can enter a maximum of two pairs if both are ranked in the top eight, while the remaining NOCs are entitled to one until the quota of 16 highest-ranked pairs is filled. 

On May 28, 2021, the Badminton World Federation had confirmed that there is no further tournament to be played inside the qualifying window due to events being cancelled or postponed from the ongoing COVID-19 pandemic. As such, while the qualification period technically closes on 15 June 2021, the current Race to Tokyo rankings list will not now be changed prior to that date, and the current standings are the final standings for the purposes of qualification. Further places may yet be made available, however, by withdrawals.

Qualifying standards 
Qualification of these Games will be based on the BWF Ranking list to be published on 15 June 2021, which will be based on results achieved during the period 29 April 2019 to 15 March 2020, and 4 January 2021 to 13 June 2021, providing a total of 16 pairs in each doubles event, and an initial allocation of 38 players in each singles event in the following criteria:

Singles:
Ranking 1-16: Players are taken in turn. A NOC may enter up to a maximum of 2 players, provided both are ranked in the top 16.
Ranking 17 and below: Players are taken in turn. A NOC may enter a maximum of 1 player.
Doubles:
Rankings 1–8: Pairs are taken in turn. A NOC may enter up to a maximum of 2 pairs, provided both pairs are ranked in the top 8.
Rankings 9 and below: Pairs are taken in turn. A NOC may enter a maximum of 1 pair.

Each of the five continental confederations will be guaranteed at least one entry in each singles and doubles event (this is called the Continental Representation Place system). If this has not been satisfied by the entry selection method described above, the highest ranked player or pair from the respective continent will qualify. An NOC can qualify players or pairs in a maximum of two events through the Continental Representation Place system; if a NOC qualifies for more than two events through the Continental Representation Place system, the NOC must choose which of them are qualified, and the quota place declined will be offered to the next NOC's eligible player or pair.

Host nation Japan is entitled to enter a male and a female badminton player in each of the singles tournaments, but more than two players may be permitted if they achieve the qualifying regulations.  Meanwhile, six quota places are made available to eligible NOCs through the Tripartite Commission Invitation, with three each in the men's and women's singles. The Tripartite Commission invitation places count for the Continental Representation Place system.

For any player who qualifies in both a doubles event and a singles event, an unused quota place will be allocated to the next best ranked eligible athlete of a respective gender in the singles events on the BWF Ranking List as of 15 June 2021. This ensures that a total of 86 men and 86 women qualify, with the individual event fields expanding from 38 to accommodate additional players.

Qualification summary

Official ranking 
All of the event was postponed and rescheduled due to the COVID-19 pandemic.

Men's singles

Women's singles

Players highlighted in red states they are not participating at the 2020 Olympics

Men's doubles

Pairs highlighted in red states they are not participating at the 2020 Olympics

Women's doubles

Mixed doubles

References

Qualification for the 2020 Summer Olympics
Qualification